Otter Creek is an unincorporated community in Twin Lakes Township, Carlton County, Minnesota, United States. The community took its name from nearby Otter Creek.

The community is located between Cloquet and Mahtowa at the junction of Carlton County Roads 5 and 61.

Otter Creek is located six miles southwest of Cloquet.  The communities of Atkinson and Iverson are both nearby.  Black Bear Casino Resort is also nearby.

Further reading
 Mn/DOT map of Carlton County – 2012 edition

Unincorporated communities in Carlton County, Minnesota
Unincorporated communities in Minnesota